Where's Wally?: The Ultimate Fun Book (Where's Waldo?: The Ultimate Fun Book in America) was a Where's Wally? activity book released in 1990. The book introduces Wilma, her dog Woof, and the Wally Watchers.

Unlike the previous three Where's Wally? books (Where's Wally?, Where's Wally Now?, and The Fantastic Journey), this book featured various puzzles and games rather than the traditional detailed crowd scenes. The other kinds of additional puzzles included spot-the-differences, coloring pages, and a board game. The book was also a smaller paperback book that included stickers and press-outs.

Scenes
 A Message from a Megastar
 A Great Moment of Romance
 The Muddy Swamp Jungle Game
 The Wonderful Portrait Puzzle
 Circus Punch-out Pages
 Sticker Pages
 The Sharp-Eyes Silhouette Game
 Old Friends
 Ding-Dong! What a Dog Fight
 The Beat of the Drums
 Oh, What a Lovely Maze!
 The Fun Goes on, and on and on and on...

Series notes
This book introduced the characters Wilma, Woof, and The Wally-Watchers - there were 99 of the latter, although subsequent books would only feature 25. It also was the first book to feature Wally's Key.

British picture books
Puzzle books
Where's Wally? books
Little, Brown and Company books
1990 children's books
British children's books